Vellanad  is a village in the Nedumangad Taluk district of Thiruvananthapuram district in the state of Kerala, India.

Demographics
 India census, Vellanad had a population of 26,760 with 13,066 males and 13,694 females.

Education 

 G.Karthikeyan Smaraka Govt. Model V HSS

Religion
Kootayanimoodu Chamundi Temple

References

Villages in Thiruvananthapuram district